Nickelodeon (abbreviated as Nick) is an Indian children's pay television network based in Mumbai, Maharashtra, India. It is the Indian equivalent to the original American Network and is owned by Viacom18, a joint venture between Paramount Global and TV18. Despite using the "Nickelodeon" branding, it does not air any content from the original American network in recent times as part of a localisation strategy, and thus, original Nickelodeon content is only broadcast on the Nickelodeon HD+ channel. As of October 2020, Nickelodeon is the most watched children's channel in India.

History
Nickelodeon was launched in India on 16 October 1999. Zee TV was in charge of distributing the channel to cable operators, in a deal made with Viacom. This is India's second children's television channel after Cartoon Network.

After that, Zee TV launched a Nickelodeon-branded programming block on its main channel, also called "Zee TV", as part of a distribution deal between Viacom International and Zee Entertainment Enterprises. It was replaced by the Cartoon Network block in 2002.

In 2004, Viacom revamped Nickelodeon in India to increase its viewership, including branding the channel just as Nick, creating local programs and launching a Hindi audio track.

On 23 November 2006, Nickelodeon India ceased to be distributed in Pakistan and was replaced with a dedicated local version of Nickelodeon in that country.

Viacom signed a programming deal with Sun TV Network in 2007 according to which Nickelodeon shows will air on Chutti TV dubbed in Tamil and Telugu. This deal was later cancelled when Nickelodeon decided to add Tamil and Telugu audio tracks to their own channel.

In 2007, the joint venture between Viacom and TV18 called Viacom18 was formed, and the channels MTV, Nick India and VH1 became part of the new company.

On 25 June 2010, Nick India was rebranded, using the newly launched logo used in US. It was the last major market to undergo this makeover.

In December 2011, Viacom 18 launched a new channel called Sonic. Initially, the channel was focused on action and adventure, before switching their focus to comedy in 2016.

Viacom18 Motion Pictures distributed Keymon Ache & Nani in Space Adventure, a film based on the Nickelodeon India series Keymon Ache in 2012. Another theatrical film, Motu Patlu: King Of Kings from the Motu Patlu franchise was released in Hindi and Tamil on 14 October 2016.

Nick Jr. was launched in late 2012 after being spun off from the main channel. As the main channel did not air any live action shows, these shows aired on TeenNick, which was aired in the evenings on Nick Jr. until 1 February 2017, when it was discontinued.

In 2013, the channel hosted its first localized Kids Choice Awards.

On 5 December 2015, Viacom18 launched Nickelodeon HD+, the first children's channel in High Definition in India. It originates a different schedule than the main network, including previously unaired international programming such as The Legend of Korra.

In March 2016, Viacom18 launched a Nick programming block named "Nick Hour" on their free-to-air channel Rishtey. The programming consists of shows like Motu Patlu, Pakdam Pakdai, The Jungle Book, Go, Diego, Go!, Keymon Ache and Chhoti Anandi (Colors TV series).

Nick India added a Kannada audio track to the channel on 1 September 2018. Four additional language tracks in Marathi, Bengali, Gujarati and Malayalam were added in 2020.

Nick India announced its first co-production with Nickelodeon International called The Twisted Timeline of Sammy & Raj, slated to air internationally in 2021.

On 24 January 2022, in association with Nickelodeon India, Colors Tamil launched the "Nick Neram" block, airing Rudra: Boom Chik Chik Boom and Golmaal Jr..

Programming

In the channel's first years of broadcasting it aired mostly original programmes from US, such as Rugrats, Aaahh! Real Monsters, As Told by Ginger, Rocket Power, The Wild Thornberrys, The Adventures of Jimmy Neutron: Boy Genius, Rocko's Modern Life, The Angry Beavers, CatDog, Hey Arnold!, The Fairly OddParents, SpongeBob SquarePants and Danny Phantom. The network also aired live action shows, such as Kenan & Kel, Drake & Josh, Clarissa Explains It All, Legends of the Hidden Temple, and others.

After the success of Nickelodeon U.S. game shows, Nick India produced two local game shows, Dum Dama Dum and Gilli Gilli Gappa. They launched J Bole Toh Jadoo, a spin-off series of 2003's Koi... Mil Gaya. The series premiered on 14 November 2004 on Children's Day.

In 2006 Nick India started acquiring Japanese animated shows such as Ninja Hattori, Perman and Mighty Cat Masked Niyander. Due to poor performance of original Nickelodeon content, the channel started to rely more on third party programming and focused on animated content only. Newer live action shows like iCarly were not aired until the launch of TeenNick in 2012 and some ongoing Nickelodeon cartoons at that time such as The Fairly OddParents were permanently removed from the channel. Only some shows like Tak and the Power of Juju and The Penguins of Madagascar premiered in later years.

Nick started airing Colors's show Jai Shri Krishna in 2009. The show was re-edited and customised for a younger audience. They also acquired Little Krishna, an animated series produced by BIG Animation India and The Indian Heritage Foundation in May 2009. Also, in 2009 the channel started acquired the French series Oggy and the Cockroaches.

Starting in 2011, Nickelodeon India started producing local animated shows, starting with Keymon Ache and a theatrical movie based on the series. The local strategy became successful with Motu Patlu in 2012, and they later launched more local animated series like Pakdam Pakdai in 2013, Shiva in 2016, Gattu Battu in 2017, Rudra in 2018 and Ting Tong in 2020. The success with domestic product gave the network the latitude to reduce their dependence on foreign content, and with the launch of Nickelodeon HD+ in 2015, the original shows from the American and British networks migrated to that channel space instead.

List of original programming

Related channels

Nick HD+ 

Nickelodeon HD+ (abbreviated as Nick HD+) launched on 5 December 2015. It is the high-definition counterpart of Nickelodeon India. Original content from the original American network are shown only on the channel.

Nick Jr. 

Before the launch of the channel, Nick Jr. was started as a block on Nickelodeon at morning times which broadcast shows for small kids like Dora the Explorer, Go Diego Go, etc.
On 21 November 2012, Viacom18 launched TeenNick and Nick Jr. as a single channel in which Nick Jr. airs in the daytime while TeenNick aired at night. However, TeenNick was discontinued since 1 February 2017, which made Nick Jr. a 24-hour channel. The block on Nickelodeon was discontinued in 2018.

Nickelodeon Sonic 

Nickelodeon Sonic was launched on 20 December 2011, focusing on action and teens. In 2016, the channel changed strategy to attract younger audiences, including producing local original content for the channel.

See also
Nickelodeon (Pakistan)
Nickelodeon (United States)
Disney Channel (India)
Cartoon Network (India)
Nickelodeon Sonic
Nickelodeon HD+

References

External links
Official Facebook page
Nick HD+ Facebook page
Official YouTube channel

India
Children's television channels in India
Indian animation
Television channels and stations established in 1999
English-language television stations in India
Television stations in Mumbai
1999 establishments in Maharashtra
Viacom 18
Television stations in India